Common equity is the amount that all common shareholders have invested in a company. Most importantly, this includes the value of the common shares themselves. However, it also includes retained earnings and additional paid-in capital.

Basel III

Under the new Basel III banking agreement large internationally active banks will be required to hold a minimum of 4.5% of their risk-adjusted assets in common equity. This regulation is to be fully effective as of 1 Jan 2019.

In the United States, the Federal Reserve has decided that all banks will need to adhere to the standard, with the largest banks required to hold an extra buffer.

References

Banking